The 2003 Skate Israel was the 7th edition of a senior-level international figure skating competition held in Metulla, Israel. It was held between October 13 and 15 at the Canada Centre. Skaters competed in the disciplines of men's singles, ladies' singles, pair skating, and ice dancing.

Results

Men

Ladies

Pairs

Ice dancing

 WD = Withdrawn

External links
 2003 Skate Israel
 Skate Israel at the Israel Ice Skating Federation

Skate Israel
Israel Skate 2003
Skate Israel 2003